David Randall Blythe (born February 21, 1971) is an American vocalist, best known as the lead singer and lyricist of heavy metal band Lamb of God and Burn The Priest. He has also performed guest vocals for Cannabis Corpse, Overkill, Gojira, Eyehategod, Eluveitie, Bad Brains, Soulfly, Clutch, Body Count, DevilDriver, Suicide Silence, Doyle, and Voodoo Glow Skulls, and is the lead singer of side-project band Halo of Locusts.

Professional career
Blythe joined Lamb of God in 1995, when they were still known as Burn the Priest. Before Lamb of God was successful, he had previously worked as a cook and a roofer. He also has a side project band known as Halo of Locusts, who were founded around 2004. A full-length release was planned, but has yet to be released. They contributed to For the Sick, the tribute album for Eyehategod, covering "Dixie Whiskey". 

In 2005, Blythe worked with the metalcore outfit A Life Once Lost on their album Hunter. He provided additional vocals on the track "Vulture" as well as helped in the vocal processing of the track. He later worked with them again in 2007 on "Iron Gag." He also appeared on the song "Skull and Bones" by the band Overkill and "Adoration for None" on Gojira's album The Way of All Flesh. He was also featured on Shadows Fall song, King of Nothing, on their 2009 release, Retribution. Blythe was featured in many of his peers' DVDs, such as Killswitch Engage's (Set This) World Ablaze and Machine Head's Elegies. Blythe was also featured in Metal: A Headbanger's Journey, Working Class Rock Star, Melissa Cross's The Zen of Screaming, and Suicide Silence's Ending Is the Beginning: The Mitch Lucker Memorial Show (2014).

He appears as Luke in the movie The Graves (2009), written and directed by Brian Pulido.

On January 5, 2012, Blythe announced that he would be running for President of the United States via a blog entry entitled "I want to be The Big Cheese". His official campaign slogan was "Fuck the dumb shit. Let's get real here." Blythe did not appear on the ballot in any of the fifty states or the District of Columbia.

On November 20, 2014, was announced that Blythe is to star in an action movie being made by Taiwanese metal band Chthonic. On July 14, 2015, Blythe's first book, Dark Days: A Memoir was released by Da Capo Press. During its first week of sales, it made the Publishers Weekly non-fiction National Best Sellers list.

In February 2016, he joined Deafheaven on stage at the Hollywood Palladium in Los Angeles with their song "Dream House". Seven months later, in September 2016, he was recruited by Eyehategod as a replacement for lead singer Mike Williams during their US tour.

In July 2018 he collaborated with DevilDriver on the covers of "Ghost Riders in the Sky" by Johnny Cash and "Whiskey River" by Willie Nelson from Devil Driver's country covers album. In October, his voice appeared in the Soulfly song "Dead Behind the Eyes" from Ritual. On April 4, 2019, Blythe made a music video for the Black Queen song "The End Where We Start".

In November 2019, Blythe was a member of the supergroup, Pigface, during the group's first tour in fourteen years. Initially, Blythe had agreed to perform with the group for the first five dates of the twelve-date tour but due to his enjoyment of it, he agreed to stay on for the remaining seven dates.

In April 2020, Blythe and Scottish brewery BrewDog announced a collaboration that yielded a non-alcoholic beer named "Ghost Walker". The name is taken from the Lamb of God song "Ghost Walking" which is on their 2012 album Resolution. Blythe wrote the lyrics to the song whilst beginning his journey to live an alcohol-free lifestyle.

Manslaughter charges and acquittal

At the end of June 2012, Blythe was arrested, charged and remanded in custody by the Czech authorities in connection with an incident that had happened during Lamb of God's previous concert in Prague two years earlier. According to the prosecution, Blythe shoved Daniel Nosek, a 19-year-old fan, off stage, thus inflicting fatal wounds on him. After being released on bail, which was contended by the State Attorney, Blythe denied responsibility for Nosek's death and pledged to return to attend the trial, which began on February 4, 2013.

According to a verdict delivered by the Municipal Court in Prague on March 5, 2013, it was proven that Blythe had shoved Nosek off the stage and Blythe thus has the moral responsibility for his death. Due to the circumstances, however, Blythe was held not criminally liable with most of the blame lying with the promoters and the security members. The State Attorney appealed the verdict, but the acquittal was upheld by the Prague High Court on June 5, 2013.

Discography

With Lamb of God

Demos (as Burn the Priest)
Demo Tape (1995, independently released)
Split with ZED (1997, Goatboy Records)
Split with Agents of Satan (1998, Deaf American Recordings)
Sevens and More (1998, mp3.com)

Studio albums
Burn the Priest  (1999, Legion Records)
New American Gospel (2000, Prosthetic Records)
As the Palaces Burn (2003, Prosthetic Records)
Ashes of the Wake (2004, Sony / BMG Music)
Killadelphia (2005, Sony / BMG Music)
Sacrament (2006, Sony / BMG Music)
Wrath (2009, Sony / Roadrunner)
Resolution (2012, Epic / Roadrunner)
VII: Sturm und Drang (2015, Epic / Nuclear Blast)
Legion: XX  (2018, Epic / Nuclear Blast)
Lamb of God (2020, Epic / Nuclear Blast)
Omens (2022, Epic / Nuclear Blast)

Guest appearances

 The Mercury Lift (2003) by Haste − guest vocals on "God Reclaims His Throne"
 Without Any Remorse (2004) by Bloodshoteye − guest vocals on "F.U.B.A.R"
 Hunter (2005) by A Life Once Lost − guest vocals on "Vulture"
 Immortalis (2007) by Overkill − guest vocals on "Skulls and Bones"
 Iron Gag (2007) by A Life Once Lost − guest vocals on "Pigeonholed"
Absentee (2008) by Pitch Black Forecast − guest vocals on "So Low"
Lesser Traveled Waters (2008) by Gollum − guest vocals on "Cross-Pollenation"
 The Way of All Flesh (2008) by Gojira − guest vocals on "Adoration for None"
 Icons of the Illogical (2009) by The Kris Norris Projekt – lead vocals
 Retribution (2009) by Shadows Fall − guest vocals on "King of Nothing"
 Jasta (2011) by Jasta – guest vocals on "Enslaved, Dead or Depraved"
 Tour dates with Chthonic in Taiwan as guest vocals
 Cannabis Corpse (2012) – vocals on the 'Cory Smoot Memorial' show
 Suicide Silence (2012) – "You Only Live Once" (vocals) at the Ending is the Beginning: Mitch Lucker Memorial Show
 Teenage Time Killers (2015) – guest vocals on "Hung Out to Dry"
 Metal Allegiance (2015) – guest vocals on "Gift of pain"
 Aquatic Occult (2016) by Sourvein – guest vocals on "Ocypuss"
 Westfield Massacre (2016) – guest vocals on "Underneath the Skin"
 Deafheaven (2016) – guest vocals (live) on "Dream House" at Hollywood, California
 Ironshore (2016) by Oni – guest vocals on "The Only Cure"
 Bloodlust (2017) by Body Count – guest vocals on "Walk with Me…"
 Doyle II: As We Die (2017) by Doyle – guest vocals on "Virgin Sacrifice"
 Souls of the Revolution (2017) by ChthoniC – guest vocals
 Outlaws 'til the End: Vol. 1 (2018) by DevilDriver – guest vocals on "Whiskey River"
 Ritual (2018) by Soulfly – guest vocals on "Dead Behind the Eyes"
 Anesthetic (2019) by Mark Morton – guest vocals on "Truth Is Dead" (with Alissa White-Gluz of Arch Enemy)
 Ategnatos (2019) by Eluveitie – guest vocals/narration on "Worship"

Filmography

References

External links

1971 births
American baritones
American heavy metal singers
20th-century American singers
21st-century American singers
Lamb of God (band) members
Living people
Manslaughter trials
People acquitted of manslaughter
Musicians from Maryland
People from Fort Meade, Maryland
Candidates in the 2012 United States presidential election
Teenage Time Killers members
Pigface members